Blas Miguel Riveros Galeano (born 3 February 1998) is a Paraguayan professional footballer who plays as a left-back for Danish Superliga club Brøndby and the Paraguay national team.

Club career

Olimpia Asunción 
Riveros started his professional career with Olimpia Asunción in the Primera División Paraguaya after coming through their youth system. He lifted the Primera División title with the club in 2015.

Basel 
On 4 May 2016, FC Basel announced that they had signed Riveros on a five-year deal. Due to Riveros' commitments with the Paraguay national football team in the Copa América, he was not expected to enter into first team training until the beginning of July. He joined Basel's first team for their 2016–17 season under head coach Urs Fischer. After playing in five test games Riveros played his debut for the club in the Swiss Cup away game in the Herti Allmend Stadion on 18 September 2016 as Basel won 1–0 against Zug 94. Riveros made his domestic league debut for his new team on 15 October 2016 in the home game against Luzern. The game ended with a 3–0 victory and Riveros played the full game.

During his first season Riveros had eight appearances in the domestic league, but also played in their U-21 team. In the 2016–17 UEFA Youth League group stage Riveros played in each of the six matches as the Basel U-19 team qualified for the knock-out round. Under trainer Urs Fischer Riveros won the Swiss Super League championship at the end of the 2016–17 Super League season. For the club this was the eighth title in a row and their 20th championship title in total. They also won the Swiss Cup for the twelfth time, which meant they had won the double for the sixth time in the club's history.

Riveros scored his first goal for his club in the home game during the 2017–18 UEFA Champions League group stage on 27 September 2017 in the St. Jakob-Park. It was the last goal of the game as Basel won 5–0 against Benfica. He scored his first domestic league goal for his team on 11 April 2018 in the home game as Basel won 3–0 against Zürich. 

Under trainer Marcel Koller Basel won the Swiss Cup in the 2018–19 season. In the first round Basel beat FC Montlingen 3–0, in the second round Echallens Région 7–2 and in the round of 16 Winterthur 1–0. In the quarter finals Sion were defeated 4–2 after extra time and in the semi finals Zürich were defeated 3–1. All these games were played away from home. The final was held on 19 May 2019 in the Stade de Suisse Wankdorf Bern against Thun. Striker Albian Ajeti scored the first goal, Fabian Frei the second for Basel, then Dejan Sorgić netted a goal for Thun, but the end result was 2–1 for Basel. Riveros played in three of the cup games.

Riveros appeared regularly in the Basel team in his first four seasons. Nevertheless to begin of his fifth he decided to leave the club and transferred to Brøndby IF. During his time with the club he played a total of 127 games for Basel scoring a total of six goals. 71 of these games were in the Swiss Super League, 11 in the Swiss Cup, 13 in the UEFA competitions (Champios League and Europa League) and 32 were friendly games. He scored three goals in the domestic league, one in the above mentioned Champions League game and the other two were scored during the test games.

Brøndby
 
On 5 October 2020, Danish Superliga club Brøndby IF announced the signing of Riveros on a four-year contract. He made his debut for the club on 5 November in a Danish Cup match against Ledøje-Smørum Fodbold, immediately contributing with an assist to the decisive goal by Simon Hedlund in a 1–0 win. In his Danish Superliga debut on 8 November, he scored the opening goal in a 3–1 home win over OB, but suffered a knee injury in the second-half after a collision with Ryan Laursen. Tests later confirmed that he had torn his posterior cruciate ligament and medial collateral ligament, keeping him sidelined for around 12 months. 

Riveros made his return to the Brøndby side on 17 October 2021, coming on as a substitute 12 minutes before the end of the match in Brøndby's 3–2 win against Vejle Boldklub. He made an immediate impact, making an assist for the 2–2 goal by Mikael Uhre.

International career 
On 28 May 2016, Riveros made his debut for the Paraguay national team against Mexico and he played the full game. He was named in Paraguay's squad for the Copa América Centenario. He failed to make an appearance, however, as Paraguay were eliminated at the group stages without having recorded a win.

Career statistics

Club

Honours 
Olimpia
 Primera División: 2015 Clausura

Basel
 Swiss Super League: 2016–17
 Swiss Cup: 2016–17, 2018–19

Brøndby
 Danish Superliga: 2020–21

References

External links 
 

1998 births
Living people
People from Itauguá
Association football defenders
Paraguayan footballers
Paraguay international footballers
Paraguayan expatriate footballers
Paraguayan Primera División players
Swiss Super League players
Danish Superliga players
Club Olimpia footballers
FC Basel players
Brøndby IF players
Expatriate footballers in Switzerland
Expatriate men's footballers in Denmark
Paraguayan expatriate sportspeople in Switzerland
Paraguayan expatriate sportspeople in Denmark
Copa América Centenario players
Paraguay under-20 international footballers